SIP Animation (known as Saban International Paris and Saban International Strasbourg until 2002) was a French animation studio, and a former subsidiary of Saban Entertainment. By 2009, the company had produced over 390 hours of animated content.

Despite the name, the company was not directly related to the Saban subsidiaries Saban International or Saban International Services.

History

Saban International Paris/Saban International Strasbourg 
Saban International Paris and Saban International Strasbourg was founded in France by Haim Saban and Jacqueline Tordjman in 1977 as a record label. The company became a subsidiary of the newly-formed Saban Entertainment in 1980, and in 1989, Saban International Paris and Saban International Strasbourg moved into the animation field, producing animated series for their parent company. Saban International Paris and Saban International Strasbourg would eventually enter a partnership with the newly formed Fox Kids Europe in the mid-90s, and so would produce many animated shows for that network in the 1990s and 2000s.

In January 1996, France 3 picked up Princess Sissi as a co-production with Saban International Paris and Saban International Strasbourg. In March 1996, it was announced that their parent company Saban Entertainment would acquire rival studio Créativité et Développement (C&D), a studio owned by DIC Entertainment co-founder Jean Chalopin., with the aim of absorbing the studio into Saban International Paris if the deal closed successfully. At the same time, SIP picked up the rights to produce an animated series based on Diabolik, which was added to their existing range of productions in development, which at the time included two Belgian-comic adaptations: Achille Talon and Iznogoud, the latter of which was pre-sold to France 2 for that summer, and three literature adaptations: Oliver Twist and two Michael Ende works Jim Button and Night of the Wishes. In August 1996, Saban and the German ARD network agreed to a three-year, $50 million co-production and library program licensing agreement to co-produce the Michael Ende adaptations.

In February 2000, it was announced that the in-development Night of the Wishes adaptation would be named Wunschpunsch and would be produced as a co-production with CinéGroupe and began production in February 2000, being pre-sold to Radio-Canada and TF1 in the same month.

In December 2000, DIC Entertainment announced that they would be co-producing Gadget and the Gadgetinis with Saban International Paris and Saban International Strasbourg, and that Saban International would hold international (outside of the U.S.) distribution rights to the series, which itself would premiere in 2002.

SIP Animation 
In 2001, Fox Family Worldwide was sold by owner News Corporation to The Walt Disney Company; this also included Saban Entertainment and Saban International Paris and Saban International Strasbourg, which were subsidiaries of Fox Family Worldwide. Saban Entertainment was renamed to BVS Entertainment, while Saban International Paris and Saban International Strasbourg was sold off after Haim Saban departed the same year. 

In April 2002, Saban International Paris and Saban International Strasbourg announced they had presold a new show - Tofu Family, later renamed to The Tofus, to the United Kingdom's ITV to air on their CITV block. It was also confirmed that the company were working on 3 different shows: Tinsellania for TF1 and Family in co-production with Studio B, Sparkiz for France 2 and ROBO for M6. None of the 3 shows were ever completed.

In the same year, The Walt Disney Company purchased a 49% minority stake within Saban International Paris and Saban International Strasbourg. The company however could no longer use the "Saban International Paris and Saban International Strasbourg" name and on October 1, 2002, the company was renamed to SIP Animation, with a new domain name for the company website following soon after. On the same day, SIP announced they were producing a TV series based on the Disney-published comic book series W.I.T.C.H., alongside two others they were already working on before the name change (Jason and the Heroes of Mount Olympus and Gadget & the Gadgetinis). All the SIP shows made during this era were distributed by Buena Vista International Television, a Disney subsidiary.

In March 2003, SIP confirmed that they were due to start work on The Tofus, as well as confirming that they would be co-producing the second season of CinéGroupe's What's with Andy?, in association with Fox Kids France and Super RTL. On the same day SIP also confirmed that they would produce a W.I.T.C.H. pilot to attract broadcasters into airing the series, as well as confirming that two shows were under development for Fox Kids Europe, one being a 2D show which TF1 was looking into airing and the other a 2D/3D show.

In September 2004, Jetix Europe announced that their next co-production with SIP would be an action-packed cartoon with the working title of The Insiders. Hasbro signed a deal to produce toys based on the show later in the month. The show's full title would eventually become A.T.O.M. - Alpha Teens on Machines, and premiered on Jetix channels all over the world in Mid-Late 2005. In October of the same year, website Kidscreen confirmed that the planned 2D show made by SIP would be titled Combo Niños and that delivery for the series would begin in early 2006. Jetix Europe and TF1 had been on-board with the series, but SIP had also been looking for other broadcasters or countries to co-produce the series.

The company made a call for short film pitches in 2006. In May 2007, SIP Animation announced that the production of Combo Niños had begun. The series eventually premiered on Jetix channels in Europe in mid 2008, and eventually Latin America in December.

In late 2007, it was confirmed that SIP would be co-producing a feature film with Korean distributor M-Line, titled Princess Bari, being the first ever French-Korean animated co-production. The film was rumored to have been completed, but was never released.

In early 2008, SIP introduced a new website and domain name. In its final year of existence, the company produced several television pilots, including Astaquana, Wesh Wesh Express, Ko-Bushi, and The Jokers; as well as an 8-minute short film titled Inukshuk, which was completed in December 2008, and premiered in May 2009.

Closure and legacy 
In 2009, following Disney's full acquisition of Jetix Europe, SIP Animation silently went dormant. On May 12, 2009, the company was subject to liquidation, and SIP Animation as a whole was listed as fully closed on June 11, 2012, with only around 1 or 2 employees remaining at that time.

Bruno Bianchi, who had worked at the company since the 90s, went on to form his own animation company called Ginkgo Animation after SIP's shutdown, and ran it before his death on December 2, 2011. One of Ginkgo's projects had been George and Me (French title Georges et Moi), an adaptation of a 2006 Soleil Productions comic series that had first been picked up by SIP Animation as early as December 2007, and had been planned to start production at SIP at the beginning of 2009. However, by April 2011 this venture of Ginkgo's was considered unsuccessful due to changing priorities in the French animation industry, according to one of the authors of the original comics.

Malaysian studio , which had previously worked as a subcontractor on Combo Niños and Wesh Wesh Express, co-produced the Ko-Bushi pilot and would eventually co-produce a full series under the slightly different title , with the involvement of Zagtoon. Zagtoon itself was co-founded by SIP co-founder Jaqueline Tordjman and also employs several key people who formally worked at SIP, like composers Alain Garcia and Noam Kaniel.

Subsequent ownership 
As of 2012, The Walt Disney Company France acts as a contact point for SIP and its former assets. Disney owns a majority of SIP's programs that were produced when the company was part of Saban Entertainment, which remain under the ownership of the Disney subsidiary BVS Entertainment (Saban Entertainment's successor company). W.I.T.C.H. (produced during the SIP era) is however owned by Disney directly as the company was involved in the production itself (not just via Jetix Europe) and published the comic books the show was based on.

The shows co-produced with CinéGroupe remain in their catalogue, and are distributed by partner company HG Distribution. Gadget & the Gadgetinis is currently owned by WildBrain, via co-producer DIC Entertainment and its ownership of the Inspector Gadget franchise. A.T.O.M. – Alpha Teens on Machines was previously licensed by independent distributor Multicom Entertainment Group, particularly including digital distribution rights. The short film Inukshuk is distributed by interfilm.

Shows produced

As Saban International Paris/Saban International Strasbourg 
Some of the shows featured the "Saban's" corporate bug in their title. Saban Entertainment itself is not listed.
 Saban's Adventures of the Little Mermaid (1991, co-production with Antenne 2, Hexatel, Fuji TV and Fuji Eight Co., Ltd.)
 Saban's Around the World in 80 Dreams (1992–1993, co-production with TF1, Canal+ and the CNC)
 Saban’s Gulliver’s Travels (1992–1993, co-production with France 2, Canal+ and the CNC)
 Journey to the Heart of the World (1993–1994, co-production with Media Films TV, Dargaud Films and Belvision Studios)
 Space Strikers (1995–1996, co-production with M6 and Montana, in association with Seoul Broadcasting System Productions)
 Iznogoud (1995, co-production with P.I.A. S.A., France 2, BBC and RTL 4 S.A.)
 Saban's The Why Why Family (1995–1998, co-production with France 3 and ARD/Degeto)
 Saban's Adventures of Oliver Twist (1996–1997)
 Saban's Sissi the Princess (1997–1998, co-production with CinéGroupe, France 3, RAI Radiotelevisione Italiana, Ventura Film Distributors B.V. and Créativité et Développement)
 Walter Melon (1997–1998, co-production with France 2, ARD/Degeto and Scottish Television Enterprises)
 Saban's Diabolik: Track of the Panther (1999–2001, co-production with M6, Ashi Productions and Mediaset S.p.A.)
 Jim Button (1999–2000, co-production with CinéGroupe, Société Radio-Canada, WDR, Ventura Film Distributors B.V., TF1, ARD/Degeto and Thomas Haffa/EM.TV & Merchandising AG)
 Wunschpunsch (2000–2001, co-production with CinéGroupe, Société Radio-Canada, Ventura Film Distributors B.V. and TF1)
 Jason and the Heroes of Mount Olympus (2001–2002, co-production with Fox Kids Europe, TF1, Fox Kids International Programming and Fox Family Properties (continued work as SIP)

As SIP Animation 
 Gadget & the Gadgetinis (2002–2003, co-production with Fox Kids Europe, Fox Kids Europe N.V., ABC Family Properties, Fox Kids International Programming, DIC Entertainment Corp., M6, Channel Five and Mediatrade S.P.A.) (taken over from Saban)
 What's with Andy? (2003–2004, co-production with CinéGroupe, Super RTL and Fox Kids France) (season 2 only)
 The Tofus (2004–2005, co-production with CinéGroupe)
 W.I.T.C.H. (2004–2006, co-production with The Walt Disney Company and France 3, in association with Jetix Europe)
 A.T.O.M. – Alpha Teens on Machines (2005–2007, co-production with Jetix Europe)
 Combo Niños (2008, co-production with Jetix Europe and TF1)

Pilots 
 Astaquana (2007)
 Wesh Wesh Express (2008)
  (2008)
 The Jokers (2008)

Short film 
 Inukshuk (2009)

References 

French animation studios
French companies established in 1977
2009 disestablishments in France
Television production companies of France
Mass media companies established in 1977
Fox Kids
Disney acquisitions
The Walt Disney Company subsidiaries
Mass media companies disestablished in 2009 
Defunct companies of France